(literally "red style") is a traditional stencilled resist dyeing technique originating in Okinawa Prefecture.  typically features a busy pattern of repeating nature motifs such as fish, flowers and fauna in a number of bright colours.  is worn during traditional Ryukyuan festivals and traditional arts performances.

 dates from the Ryūkyū Kingdom period (14th century), when the island of Okinawa experienced an influx of foreign goods and manufacturing techniques. It is believed to have developed as a synthesis of Indian, Chinese, and Javanese dyeing processes.

Terminology 
The term  was noted in the early 20th century Okinawan usage by Dr. Yoshitaro Kamakura, a Japanese scholar, to refer to painting with dyes.  was then defined by Kamakura after he had studied the ancient records as connoting cochineal red with cinnabar, which was imported from Fujian, China. Kamakura then concluded that the terminology of "applying " eventually began to refer to the colouring of cloth in general, including cochineal, yellow, indigo, and black dyes, which were applied on fabric over a rice-paste resist.

History
The Ryukyu Kingdom, having a strong trade system between Korea, Japan, China and other Southeast Asian countries in the 15th and 16th centuries, utilised fabric decoration techniques originating in these countries to create an independent style of dyework featuring nature-inspired designs reflecting the Ryukyu Islands. The abundant flora and fauna gave the resulting fabric a strong natural influence, resulting in the development of the designs typically seen in  today.

In 1609, Japan invaded the Ryukyu Kingdom, and trade with foreign countries was prohibited. In order to improve the  technique, the Ryukyu people invited foreign craftsmen to the island and had their own people travel abroad to master various craft techniques. The goods produced for the Japanese by the Ryukyu people were also judged by an exacting and high standard set by the royal authorities, resulting in the exported goods reaching a high level of craftsmanship that generated a strong desire for Ryukyu crafts and goods. In a report from a Chinese envoy dated 1802, the writer speaks of the beautiful  from Okinawa, commenting that the flowers depicted in the fabric were so vibrant that the fabric must have been produced using a "production secret that they do not reveal to others".

To achieve the color white, ground chalk or powdered shells were used. Other colours were achieved using cochineal, vermilion, arsenic, and sulphur. Some patterns used up to 18 different colour applications. After the Ryukyu Kingdom came under Japanese rule, the Ryukyu people could no longer trade for these pigments, and sought new ways to continue with their painting. Production of the finer and brighter varieties of  had come to a halt and the workers turned to working with the materials which were readily available. Indigo was all that was left, so production for the general public became popular.

Special permission was given to only three families to produce . Each family had their own designs which they passed onto future generations. There were a total of 45 dyers, the best residing in the capital of Shuri. To make the stencils, thin sheets of mulberry paper were glued together with persimmon tannin, making them thick and durable. Then they were smoked and aged, and finally the designs were drawn onto the paper and cut. Making  kimono was labour-intensive, and only royalty or the wealthy could afford them. The designs were held under strict control, and the distinction between classes was easily recognized by the kimono worn. Patterns for the royal household were very bold and colorful, while the general public wore simple and dark patterns of indigo or black. Only the royal family wore the yellow, while nobility wore pale blue. On special occasions, the commoners were given permission to wear certain special colors. The women in the royal family were very particular about their kimono, and forbade anyone to copy the same kimono pattern style.

During the Battle of Okinawa, much was lost, and production stopped due to the destruction of the shops. After the war, a former  artist, Eiki Shiroma, went to mainland Japan in search of original  stencils which had been taken by collectors and Japanese soldiers. He found some and brought the art back to life. The U.S. occupation of Japan saw a new type of customer, and the  business flourished while the troops bought bingata postcards as souvenirs. Eiki Shiroma's son, Eijun Shiroma, is continuing the family tradition as the 15th generation of his family to be practicing the techniques handed down since the time  was produced under the patronage of the Ryukyu Kingdom. Eijun's works can still be seen today at his Shimroma Studio.

The oldest  piece known was found on the island of Kumejima and dates to the late 15th century. In recent years, variations of the pigments have been created, and hibiscus, deigo flowers and sugar cane leaves have been used in the designs.

Manufacturing process

Although  kimono are hard to come by, hand-made  T-shirts can be found for around $40 and  curtains for around $200. A cotton  kimono can cost about $500 and a silk kimono $1,000.

There are ten labour-intensive steps to producing Ryukyu :

 Stencil cutting:Mulberry papers are coated with persimmon tannin and sealed together to form a firm sheet. A design is drawn onto the paper directly or traced from another source. The details are cut with a small blade and afterwards it is coated again to keep it from bending.
 Stencil resist painting:A special rice-paste made from boiled rice, rice bran and water is scraped across the top of the stencil on the cloth.
 Freehand resist painting:If a large area is needed to be painted, a freehand technique is used to apply the rice-paste resist onto the fabric. The paste is put into a bag and squeezed onto the fabric.
 Painting:Prepared paints are painted onto the fabric starting from lighter to darker colours. One design can use from 9 to 18 different colours.
 Re-painting:To achieve a more vibrant colour the paints are added once more and this time rubbed into the cloth with a stiff brush made out of human hair.
 Details:Details around the edges of each object are added to emphasise the image. Next the fabric is steamed so the colours will set into the fabric and then it is washed.
 Background resist:To paint the background a separate colour, the rice-paste resist is now placed on all the previously painted areas.
 Background painting:The entire background of the fabric is painted with a wide brush or dipped in a dye bath.
 Colour setting:The fabric is set in a steamer for an hour to let the colours set.
 Washing:The fabric is washed and dried.

An example of  can be found in The Journal of Decorative and Propaganda Arts.

References

Josef Kreiner. "Ryūkyū." In Grove Art Online. Oxford Art Online, http://www.oxfordartonline.com/subscriber/article/grove/art/T074794 (accessed August 1, 2008).
Kawakami, S. (2007). Ryukyu and Ainu Textiles. Kyoto National Museum. Retrieved Aug 3, 2008, from http://www.kyohaku.go.jp/eng/dictio/data/senshoku/ryui.htm
Okinawa's Dyed and Woven Textiles - Bingata. (2003). Wonder Okinawa. Retrieved Aug 3, 2008, from https://web.archive.org/web/20060331065841/http://www.wonder-okinawa.jp/010/eng/002/index.html

External links 
Bingata Kijimuna  painting experience and products
 at Wonder Okinawa.
Ryukyuan and Ainu textiles description page with pictures

Japanese art terminology
Printed fabrics
Ryukyuan culture
Japanese dyeing techniques